Kotil is a surname. Notable people with the surname include:

 Arlene Kotil (1934–2022), American baseball player
 Aytekin Kotil (1934–1992), Turkish politician
 Temel Kotil (born 1959), Turkish engineer and bureaucrat

Surnames of Turkish origin